Judeir-jo-daro, also known as Damb Judeir, is an archaeological site dating back to the Harappan period in Balochistan, Pakistan.

The present day site is a federally protected archaeological site located between Jhat Pat and Dera Murad Jamali in the Nasirabad District of Balochistan.

References

Archaeological sites in Balochistan, Pakistan
Nasirabad District